Canthotomy (also called lateral canthotomy and canthotomy with cantholysis) is a procedure where the lateral canthus, or corner, of the eye is cut to relieve pressure behind the eye. The procedure is typically done in emergent situations when the pressure in or behind the eye becomes too high, which can cause damage to the optic nerve and lead to blindness if left untreated. The most common cause of elevated eye pressure is orbital compartment syndrome caused by trauma, retrobulbar hemorrhage, infections, tumors, and prolonged hypoxemia. Absolute contraindications to canthotomy include globe rupture. Complications include bleeding, infections, cosmetic deformities, and functional impairment of eyelids. Lateral canthotomy further specifies that the lateral canthus is being cut. Canthotomy with cantholysis includes cutting the lateral palpebral ligament, also known as the canthal tendon.

History 
The first case of orbital compartment syndrome causing monocular blindness was published in 1950 due to a complication of a zygomatic fracture repair. In 1953 the first surgical orbital decompression was performed. Two incisions below and above the external canthus were made and surgical drains were put in place. In 1990 the first lateral canthotomy procedure as presently performed was completed. In 1994 lateral canthotomy was first published in a review of procedures that emergency physicians can perform.  Today a canthotomy is almost always performed with cantholysis of the inferior canthal tendon as this provides the best decompression of intraocular pressure.

Indications 
A Canthotomy is often used as a last resort to decompress orbital compartment syndrome (OCS). Orbital compartment syndrome can be caused by trauma, infections, tumors, retrobulbar hemorrhage, and prolonged hypoxemia. Orbital compartment syndrome can be recognized by elevated intraocular pressure (IOP), globe compressibility, afferent pupillary defect, proptosis, decreased visual acuity, and decreased extraocular muscle movements. 

Studies in animals have demonstrated irreversible vision loss within 90 to 120 minutes, further indicating the emergent nature of this procedure.  

In an unconscious patient who is unable to comply with a physical exam, an intraocular pressure greater than 40 indicates emergent canthotomy.

Contraindications 
The foremost absolute contraindication to canthotomy is globe rupture, sometimes referred to as an open globe injury. Globe rupture can be recognized by these symptoms or physical exam features: 

 Irregular shaped pupil or iris
 Subconjunctival hemorrhage
 Enophthalmos
 Conjunctival or scleral tear

Due to the emergent nature of this procedure and the possibility of restoring or preventing vision loss, globe rupture is the only absolute contraindication.

Complications 
Due to portions of the procedure having poor visualization of anatomical structures, and the overall rarity and difficulty of the procedure, iatrogenic globe injury is an immediate complication that can occur. Other complications include infections, bleeding, cosmetic deformities, and functional impairment of eyelids.

Technique 
A lateral canthotomy with cantholysis has limited steps and is meant to be done rapidly in order to decompress orbital compartment syndrome as fast as possible. General steps are as follows:

1.     Anesthetize the lateral canthus, where the incision will take place. Allow time for anesthetic to take effect.

2.     Irrigate the eye, specifically the canthus, with saline to flush out any foreign objects or debris.

3.     With a hemostat, clamp the lateral corner of the inferior eyelid for 60 seconds. Ensure that the hemostat extends laterally more than a few centimeters. This helps devascularize tissue as well as provide a landmark to make the incision.

4.     Using forceps, raise the skin around the lateral canthus. Using iris scissors or a surgical blade make a 2 centimeter incision where the hemostat was placed.  

5.     Use blunt dissection to identify the inferior lateral canthal tendon, (often referred to as the inferior crus), or use forceps to lower the inferior eye lid in order to visualize the inferior lateral canthal tendon.

6.     Cut the inferior lateral canthal tendon using iris scissors; this should cause laxity of the eye lid.

7.     Check the intraocular pressure of the eye to ensure decompression has occurred. If intraocular pressure exceeds 40 mmHg the process must be repeated on the superior lateral canthal tendon.

Alternatives 
Due the infrequency and difficulty of canthotomy, emergency medicine physicians defer more than 50% of canthotomies to a consulting physician, which in turn can increase time to treatment. In an effort to decrease difficulty and improve patient outcomes, vertical lid split or paracanthal "one snip" procedures have been studied. This is performed by making a full thickness vertical incision a few millimeters medial from the lateral canthus in both the upper and lower eyelids.

Footnotes

References 

 Brady, C. J. (2023, February 14). How to do lateral canthotomy - eye disorders. Merck Manuals Professional Edition. Retrieved March 11, 2023, from https://www.merckmanuals.com/professional/eye-disorders/how-to-do-eye-procedures/how-to-do-lateral-canthotomy
 Chapter 162. Lateral canthotomy and cantholysis or acute orbital compartment syndrome management. Reichman E.F.(Ed.), (2013). Emergency Medicine Procedures, 2e. McGraw Hill. https://accessemergencymedicine.mhmedical.com/content.aspx?bookid=683&sectionid=45343809
 Lem M, Oyur KB, Labove G, Hoang-Tran C, Bhola R, Pfaff MJ. Lateral Canthotomy and Cantholysis for Spontaneous Retrobulbar Hemorrhage With Normal Intraocular Pressures: Case Report and Review of the Literature. FACE. 2022;3(4):536-539. doi:10.1177/27325016221128771
Wikipedia Student Program